Republic Day is a public holiday in Northern Cyprus commemorating the declaration of the Turkish Republic of Northern Cyprus on 15 November 1983. The annual celebrations start at 12:00 am on 14 November and continue in 15 November. On 15 November, celebrations are made in all districts of country and representatives from several countries, especially Turkey visits Northern Cyprus and attend the celebrations. Main celebration locations are the Kemal Atatürk Memorial in Nicosia, Nicosia Martyrs Memorial and tomb of Fazıl Küçük.

References 

Remembrance days
Northern Cyprus
Public holidays in Northern Cyprus